Bica may refer to:

 Bica (coffee), a type of coffee beverage originally from Portugal
 Bica, Cluj, one of 6 villages comprising the Mănăstireni commune in Cluj County, Romania
 Bica-Q, a trade name of the antiandrogen bicalutamide
 Fazenda da Bica, a region of Rio de Janeiro, Brazil
 Quinta da Bica, a quinta (estate) near Seia, Beira region, Portugal
 Bicalutamide, a drug used to treat prostate cancer and in feminizing hormone therapy

People
 Bica (footballer) (Marcus Di Giuseppe, born 1972), Brazilian footballer
 Camillo Mac Bica (born 1947), American philosopher, poet, activist, and author
 Carlos Bica (active from 1998), Portuguese jazz bassist
 Sergio Bica (born 1983), Uruguayan footballer
 Adrian Bică Bădan (born 1988), Romanian footballer

BICA
 Bahamas Institute of Chartered Accountants, a professional association
 Banque Internationale pour la Centrafrique, a bank
 BICA Honduras, a non-profit environmental organization in Honduras
 Biologically inspired cognitive architectures, an artificial intelligence research project

See also
 Ascensor da Bica, a funicular railway line in the civil parish of Misericórdia, Lisbon, Portugal